The shielded worm lizard (Leposternon scutigerum) is a worm lizard species in the family Amphisbaenidae. It is found in Brazil.

References

Leposternon
Reptiles described in 1820
Taxa named by Wilhelm Hemprich
Endemic fauna of Brazil
Reptiles of Brazil